"Algo Tienes" is a song recorded by Mexican recording artist Paulina Rubio for her seventh album, Pau-Latina (2004). It was written and produced by Chris Rodríguez with additional writing by Manny Benito. The song was released as the album's second single on May 19, 2004, by Universal Music Mexico.

Music video
The accompanying music video for "Algo Tienes" was directed by Dago González in Torrance, California. Its shooting lasted for 20 hours, and featured P J López in its photography, and Cristóbal Valecillos as production designer. Director González said about working with the singer: "Working with Pau has been one of the most rewarding experiences, because she has no problems, she is very open and fanned. When I would make a suggestion she always would add something. When I would say "Go" she would say "Yes", but that she would do more, and this makes her like no other". It depicts Rubio as a sensual DJ who transforms a construction site into a party. She can be seen completely naked in some scenes, covered with a yellow police tape written "Caution".

Chart performance
Although "Algo Tienes" did not reach the US Billboard Hot 100, it managed to reach number 21 on the Bubbling Under Hot 100 chart, and number four on the Hot Latin Songs – becoming the album's second consecutive top ten single – and number one on the Latin Pop Airplay.

Live performances
Rubio performed the song at the 2005 Latin Billboard Music Awards, wearing a feathered headdress, similar to those of Native Americans. In 2015, MSN called it one of the best performances in the awards show of all time, stating that "A combination of the wardrobe, choreography and her sexy looks that made Paulina's performance one to remember".

Formats and track listing
These are the formats and track listings of major single releases of "Algo Tienes".
Mexico CD promo
 "Algo Tienes"

Charts

Weekly charts

Year-end charts

Rouge version

The Brazilian girl group pop Rouge made a version for the song, titled "Pá Pá Lá Lá", for their third studio album, Blá Blá Blá (2004). The version was written and produced by Rick Bonadio, and released as the album's third and final single on November 27, 2004.

Launched as the album's last single, "Pá Pá Lá Lá" had a good performance in the charts, being able to enter the Top 15 of Hot 100 Brasil, in position number 20. To promote the song, the group went to various TV shows. In addition, the group also sang the song on Blá Blá Blá Tour (2004) and Mil e Uma Noites Tour (2005).

Composition and lyrics
The version of "Algo Tienes", titled "Pá Pá Lá Lá", was written and produced by Rick Bonadio, bringing the same elements of the original song, with some more "Brazilian" beats. is not feeling normal, and that something is happening, while Fantine says that he has gone mad, and that the person makes her lose control. The chorus brings Karin with the lead voice, singing, "Your strength dominates me, I scream" pá pá pá pá lá lá lá lá ... Your look hypnotizes me I feel "pá pá pá pá lá lá lá lá..."

Charts

References

2004 singles
Paulina Rubio songs
Spanish-language songs
Universal Music Latino singles
Rouge (group) songs
Brazilian songs
Portuguese-language songs
Dance-pop songs
Songs written by Rick Bonadio